Belgium–France relations are the interstate relations between Belgium and France. Relations were established after the independence of Belgium. Both nations are great allies. Both nations have cultural similarities. Both nations are founding  members of NATO,  the Organisation internationale de la Francophonie and the European Union.

History
After the independence of Belgium in 1830, there were fears that the new country would come under French influence, thus leading to a disruption of the European balance of power of the Concert of Europe. When the peace treaty with the Netherlands was drawn up, the important fortress cities of Luxembourg and Maastricht were given back to the Dutch king. This was to prevent France from controlling these strategic locations at the start of a new general European war.

When Napoleon III came to power in France, he made designs on Belgium. These were later abandoned.

During both World Wars Belgium and France fought on the same side.

Nowadays the countries are close allies.

Diaspora  
In the 1850s, Belgians made up one third of the foreign nationals living in France. As of 2013, there were 133,066 registered Belgians living in France.

Diplomatic visits
In May 2007, French President Nicolas Sarkozy visited Belgian Prime Minister Guy Verhofstadt.

In February 2008, Prime Minister Verhofstadt visited President Sarkozy.

In February 2014, King Philippe and Queen Mathilde visited Paris, where they were welcomed during a visite de Courtoisie. They were received by the President François Hollande.

Economic cooperation
In 2007, French president Sarkozy and Belgian Prime Minister Verhofstadt called for the euro zone to have an economic government.

In September 2008, the French government acted with the Belgian government and with other stakeholders to grant Franco-Belgian bank Dexia a €6.4 billion bailout.

Agreements
The two countries signed a trade agreement in 1934.

In 1997, French and Belgian defence ministers  Alain Richard and Jean-Paul Poncelet signed an agreement  providing for Belgium's use of the French armed forces' Syracuse communication satellite system.

Resident diplomatic missions 
 Belgium has an embassy in Paris and consulates-general in Marseille and Strasbourg.
 France has an embassy in Brussels.

See also 
Foreign relations of Belgium 
Foreign relations of France
List of Ambassadors of France to Belgium
Belgium–France border
Franco-Belgian comics

References

Further reading
 Alexander, Martin S. "In lieu of alliance: The French general staff's secret co‐operation with neutral Belgium, 1936–1940." Journal of Strategic Studies 14#4 (1991) pp: 413-427. https://doi.org/10.1080/01402399108437461

 Baeteman, G. "The Original System of the Code Napoleon in Belgium and Holland." Comparative Law of Matrimonial Property (1972): 1-17.

 Bernstein, Paul. "The Economic Aspect of Napoleon III's Rhine Policy." French Historical Studies 1.3 (1960): 335-347.
 Bernstein, Paul. "Napoleon III and Bismarck: The Biarritz-Paris Talks of 1865." in Diplomacy in an Age of Nationalism (Springer, Dordrecht, 1971) pp. 124-143.  Bismarck suggested France take over Belgium.

 Cook, Bernard A. Belgium: A history (Peter Lang, 2002).
 Deseure, Brecht. "The Faces of Power: History and the Legitimation of Napoleonic Rule in Belgium." French Historical Studies 40.4 (2017): 555-588.
 Hayworth, Jordan R. Revolutionary France's War of Conquest in the Rhineland: Conquering the Natural Frontier, 1792-1797 (Cambridge University Press, 2019).

 Helmreich, Jonathan E. Belgium and Europe: a study in small power diplomacy (Walter de Gruyter, 2019).
 Rapport, Michael. "Belgium under French occupation: Between collaboration and resistance, July 1794 to October 1795." French history 16.1 (2002): 53-82.
 Zolberg, Aristide R. "The Making of Flemings and Walloons: Belgium: 1830-1914." Journal of Interdisciplinary History 5.2 (1974): 179-235. online

 
Relations of colonizer and former colony
France
Bilateral relations of France